Tarlan Guliyev (born on 19 April 1992) is an Azerbaijani professional footballer who plays as a defender for Azerbaijan Premier League side Keşla.

Statistics

International goals
Scores and results list Azerbaijan's goal tally first.

References

External links
 
 

1992 births
Living people
Association football defenders
Azerbaijani footballers
Sumgayit FK players
Qarabağ FK players
Kapaz PFK players
Shamakhi FK players
Azerbaijan Premier League players
Azerbaijan under-21 international footballers
Azerbaijan youth international footballers
Azerbaijan international footballers
Footballers from Baku
Neftçi PFK players